This article is about the phonology of the Latvian language. It deals with synchronic phonology as well as phonetics.

Consonants 
Table adopted from 

  are denti-alveolar, while  are alveolar.
 The consonant sounds  are only found in loanwords.
 Latvian plosives are not aspirated (unlike in English).
At the same time single voiced consonants (etc.) are not devoiced word-finally:  ,  .
 Doubled consonants are pronounced longer:  .
 A palatalized dental trill  is still used in some dialects (mainly outside Latvia) but quite rarely, and hence the corresponding letter  was removed from the alphabet.

Vowels 
Latvian has six vowels, with length as distinctive feature:

The vowel length ratio is about 1:2.5. Vowel length is phonemic and plays an important role in the language. For example,   means 'made of wood',   means 'on the tree';   means 'a drop', and   means 'a duck'.

Latvian also has 10 diphthongs, although some diphthongs are mostly limited to proper names and interjections.

Pitch accent 
Standard Latvian and, with a few minor exceptions, all of the Latvian dialects, have fixed initial stress. Long vowels and diphthongs have a tone, regardless of their position in the word. This includes the so-called "mixed diphthongs", composed of a short vowel followed by a sonorant. There are three types of tones:
 level (also drawling, sustained) tone
 high throughout the syllable
 e.g.,   ('spring onion')
 falling tone
 brief rise followed by a long fall
 e.g.,   ('arch') (pronounced lùoks)
 broken tone (lauztā intonācija)
 rising tone followed by falling tone with interruption in the middle or some creakiness in the voice
 e.g.,   ('window')

Besides the three-tone system of the standard variety, there are also Latvian dialects with only two tones: in western parts of Latvia, the falling tone has merged with the broken tone, while in eastern parts of Latvia the level tone has merged with the falling tone.

This system is phonetically more or less similar to the ones found in Lithuanian, Swedish, Norwegian and Serbo-Croatian. The broken tone has some similarity to the Danish stød.

Alternations 
In this example, the vocalic alternant  is realized as the off-glide of the diphthong . 'fish-NOM.PL.').

Notes

References

 
 

Latvian language
Baltic phonologies